I'm in the Mood For Love...The Most Romantic Melodies of All Time is the third cover album and fourteenth studio album by saxophonist Kenny G. It was released by Arista Records in 2006 and was the last album for the label. The Asian version also includes a bonus track.

The album debuted at number 37 on the United States Billboard 200, selling about 32,000 copies in its first week. As of February, 2008 the album has sold 250,000 copies in United States. This was also the album's peak position on the chart. It also reached number 1 on the Contemporary Jazz chart and number 22 on the R&B/Hip-Hop Albums chart.

Track listing
"You're Beautiful" (Amanda Ghost; James Blunt; Sacha Skarbek) – 4:16
"The Way We Were" (Alan Bergman; Marilyn Bergman; Marvin Hamlisch) – 2:53
"Yesterday" (John Lennon; Paul McCartney) – 3:03
"I'm in the Mood for Love" (Dorothy Fields; Jimmy McHugh) – 4:05
"If" (David Gates) – 3:28
"The Way You Look Tonight" (Dorothy Fields; Jerome Kern) – 4:17
"If I Ain't Got You" (Alicia Keys) – 4:03
"Love Theme From "Romeo & Juliet" (Nino Rota) – 3:47
"It Had to Be You" (Gus Kahn; Isham Jones) – 3:56
"The Shadow of Your Smile" (Johnny Mandel; Paul Francis Webster) – 4:09
"Fly Me to the Moon / You Make Me Feel So Young" (Bart Howard / Josef Myrow; Mack Gordon) – 3:34
"As Time Goes By" (Herman Hupfeld) – 3:35
"You Raise Me Up" (Rolf Løvland; Brendan Graham) – 3:15
"The Moon Represents My Heart" (Sun Yi/Weng; Qing Xi) – 3:36 (Teresa Teng)

Personnel 
 Kenny G – saxophones
 Walter Afanasieff – keyboards, acoustic piano, Hammond B3 organ, keyboard programming, programming, arrangements 
 David Channing – programming 
 Thomas "Tawgs" Salter – programming 
 Dennis Budmir – guitars 
 Ramón Stagnaro – guitars, nylon guitar
 Emerson Swinford – guitars 
 Chuck Berghoffer – bass
 Brian Bromberg – bass 
 Dave Stone – bass
 Gregg Bissonette – drums 
 Vinnie Colaiuta – drums 
 Peter Erskine – drums 
 Jorge Calandrelli – orchestral arrangements and conductor 
 William Ross – orchestral arrangements and conductor 
 Randy Waldman – horn arrangements, orchestral arrangements and conductor 
 Gina Zimmitti – orchestral contractor

References

2006 albums
Kenny G albums
Arista Records albums
Albums produced by Walter Afanasieff
Albums produced by Clive Davis